The Man from Snowy River is an Australian adventure drama television series based on Banjo Paterson's poem "The Man from Snowy River". Released in Australia as Banjo Paterson's The Man from Snowy River, the series was subsequently released in both the United States and the United Kingdom as Snowy River: The McGregor Saga.

The series follows the adventures of Matt McGregor (Andrew Clarke), a successful squatter, and his family. Matt is the hero immortalized in Banjo Paterson's poem "The Man from Snowy River", and the series is set 25 years after his famous ride. The television series has no relationship to the 1982 film The Man from Snowy River or the 1988 sequel The Man from Snowy River II.

Synopsis 
The first season was very much a soap opera with several story arcs. The primary one concerns the arrival of Matt's American nephew, who's bent on revenge, certain that Matt cheated his father out of the station Matt now owns. In subsequent seasons, there were shorter story-arcs, often featuring guest stars over a few episodes, and some episodes stood entirely on their own.

Cast 
Stars and guest stars of the series included notables and future notables Andrew Clarke, Guy Pearce, Josh Lucas, Victoria Tennant, Olivia Newton-John, Tracy Nelson, Lee Horsley, Dean Stockwell, Chad Lowe, Jane Badler, Wendy Hughes, Hugh Jackman, and Frances O'Connor.

Nomination

Nominated for a Logie Award for Most Popular Drama (1996).

International distribution

When the series was distributed to some countries, the title was changed for various reasons.

The series was aired on Family Channel in the US and UK, and on WIC-owned and independent stations in Canada.

Episodes

Season 1 (1994)
 The Race (1994)
 Pascoe's Principles (23 September 1994)
 Kathleen's Choice (23 September 1994)
 Partnerships (25 September 1994)
 Where There's Smoke (2 October 1994)
 Tracks of Gold (9 October 1994)
 Plans of Poison (16 October 1994)
 Stepping Out (23 October 1994)
 The Bushranger (30 October 1994)
 The Rustlers (6 November 1994)
 The Loneliness of Luke McGregor (13 November 1994)
 Love Finds a Way (20 November 1994)
 The Stampede (27 November 1994)

Season 2 (1995)
 The Hostage (13 August 1995)
 The Savage Land (20 August 1995)
 The Railroad (27 August 1995)
 Fathers and Sons (3 September 1995)
 The Manly Art (10 September 1995)
 The Dry Argument (17 September 1995)
 Servant of the People (1 October 1995)
 The Search (8 October 1995)
 The Lost Child (15 October 1995)
 The Foundling (22 October 1995)
 The Long Arm of the Law (29 October 1995)
 The Recruit (5 November 1995)
 The Reilly Gang (12 NOV 1995)
 The Choice (19 November 1995)
 Man and Boy (26 November 1995)
 Flight of Fancy (11 February 1996)
 Code of Ethics (18 February 1996)
 The Cutting Edge (25 February 1996)
 House of Worship (10 March 1996)

Season 3 (1995)
 A Sea of Troubles (1995)
 Rough Passage (1995)
 The Grand Wedding (1995)
 Montana Territory (1995)
 High Country Justice (1995)
 The Question of Danni (1995)
 The Prodigal Father: Part 1 (1995)
 The Prodigal Father: Part 2 (1995)
 Fire Boy 199
 Blind Faith (1995)
 Shoshoni Dreaming (1995)
 The Trial of Hetti Lewis (1995)
 Toy Soldiers (1995)
 A Mid-Winter Nights Dream (1995)
 In Duty Bound (1995)
 The Lion and the Lamb (1995)
 Broken Hearts (1995)
 Deliverance (1995)
 A New Life: Part 1 (1995)
 A New Life: Part 2 (1995)

Season 4 (1996)
 Comeback (1996)
 The Grand Opening (1996)
 Black Sheep (1996)
 Prince of Hearts (1996)
 The Grand Duke (1996)
 New Business (1996)
 Foundation Day (1996)
 The Lovers (1996)
 The Claimant (1996)
 The Loaded Deck (1996)
 Difficult Times (1996)
 A Son for a Son: Part 1 (1996)
 A Son for a Son: Part 2 (1996)

Video releases

On 27 June 1995, the pilot was released on VHS

On 5 March 2002, a number of single episode videos were released on VHS. These include episodes "New Business", "Grand Opening", "Black Sheep", "Comeback", "The Grand Duke", and "Prince of Hearts"

In 2003, a region 1 DVD of the series pilot was released.

In 2004, season 4 was released as a 3 disk set, this time in region 4. This was followed by season 1 (3 disks) and season 2 (4 disks) in 2005, and season 3 (4 disks) in 2006.

On 25 January 2005, three 2-episode DVDs from the series were released in region 1. These episodes were the same as they had previously released on VHS.

In 2006, a 3-episode DVD was released in region 1, containing episodes previously released on VHS and DVD. In early 2007, a second DVD was released containing the remaining three previously released episodes. Later in 2007, a third DVD was released. Though the DVD case misreports two of the episodes as titles from the previous release, the actual contents are three never-before released episodes.

 The DVD case erroneously reports the episodes as "Foundation Day", "The Grand Duke", and "New Business".

In 2008, all three of their previous DVDs was released as a set. The package contained one DVD case for "There was more than one wild west!" and a new double DVD case for the other two. The erroneous episode information for the third volume was corrected on the box and the double DVD case.

In 2010, a combined 2-DVD package was released containing the last two DVDs (Adventure in the Australian Outback and A Different Breed of Cowboy).

In 2010, the entire series was released for region 4, commemorating the 120th anniversary of the poem.

In 2011, season 1 was released for region 2 with Danish, Swedish, Norwegian and Finnish subtitles.

Notes
Geoff Burrowes producer of the Snowy River films sued the producers of the series for using the title. The case settled out of court.

See also
 Snowy River
 Daylesford, The Town Where The Show Was Filmed

References

 The Dictionary of Performing Arts in Australia – Theatre . Film . Radio . Television – Volume 1 – Ann Atkinson, Linsay Knight, Margaret McPhee – Allen & Unwin Pty. Ltd., 1996.

External links 
 Snowy River: The McGregor Saga (The Man from Snowy River) – Australian Television Information Archive
 
 Snowy River: The McGregor Saga – TV.com
The Man From Snowy River – at the National Film and Sound Archive (Australian Government website)

Australian adventure television series
Man from Snowy River (TV series), The
Man from Snowy River (TV series), The
Man from Snowy River (TV series), The
Nine Network original programming
1993 Australian television series debuts
1996 Australian television series endings
Television shows set in colonial Australia
Television series about families
Television shows based on poems
Television shows set in Victoria (Australia)
Television series by MTM Enterprises